Beis Yaakov High School is a Jewish secondary school with academy status for girls. It is in Higher Broughton, Salford, in the English county of Greater Manchester.
See Beis Yaakov for a discussion of the school's philosophy and positioning.

The school primarily serves the Haredi Jewish community in Salford, Bury, and Manchester. It was founded as a private school in 1957, and became a state-funded voluntary aided school in 2005. The school converted to academy status in 2012.

References

External links

Jews and Judaism in Manchester
Secondary schools in Salford
Jewish schools in England
Haredi Judaism in the United Kingdom
Girls' schools in Greater Manchester
Orthodox Jewish educational institutions
Educational institutions established in 1957
1957 establishments in England
Academies in Salford
Orthodox Jewish schools for women